= Whaletone =

Whaletone Ltd.
- Industry: Musical instruments
- Headquarters: United Kingdom
- Key people: Robert Majkut
- Products: Digital grand pianos
- Website: http://www.whaletone.com

Whaletone is a British company headed by Polish designer Robert Majkut that produces a series of digital grand pianos noted for their advanced aesthetic and technical design.
